is a Japanese professional drifting driver, currently competing in the D1 Grand Prix series for Team Orange and Yuke’s.

Like many of the drivers in the D1GP he is the owner of his own tuning shop called Proshop Rapid, and so has worked on many of his cars himself.

He began competing in the D1 Grand Prix in the first round in 2000, earning second place in round 4 of that year and so showing that he had what it takes. Over the years he has competed in many different cars from a Toyota Corolla Levin AE85 for Team Droo-P, which was converted to a Toyota Sprinter Trueno AE86 and later used by his teammate Toshiki Yoshioka in 2005, Toyota Chaser and Nissan Silvia S15 for Greddy and even a year in a Nissan 350Z once again for Team Droo-P. In 2006, he went back to the Nissan  Silvia S15, sponsored by Wisesquare (previously driven by Makoto Sezaki) with which he had much success, getting his first win with that machine, and again, driving Team M.O.V.E.'s second S15 (which Kazama used for D1GP 2006 Silverstone and D1GP 2006 Las Vegas) while his friend and teammate at the time, Katsuhiro Ueo drove the first S15, which was Kazama's 2005 championship car, and to become the fourth member of Team Orange, driving Nobushige Kumakubo's 2006 championship winning Subaru Impreza. So far he has been doing well adapting to the new car, as he has done so often before, though he had a large accident at the Tokyo Drift exhibition match in early 2008.

Complete Drifting Results

D1 Grand Prix

Sources
D1 Grand Prix

Japanese racing drivers
Drifting drivers
1971 births
Living people
D1 Grand Prix drivers